Stizolophus is a genus of flowering plants belonging to the family Asteraceae.

Its native range is Eastern Mediterranean to Central Asia and Afghanistan.

References

Cynareae
Asteraceae genera